Palasport may refer to:

Indoor sports arenas
(by city)
 Palasport Del Mauro, Avellino, Italy
 Palasport Biella, Biella, Italy
 Unipol Arena, Bologna, Italy, formerly known as Palasport Casalecchio
 Palasport Pianella, Cucciago, Cantù, Italy
 Palasport Mario Radi, Cremona, Italy
 Nelson Mandela Forum, Florence, Italy, formerly known as Palasport
 Palasport di Genova, Genoa, Italy
 Palasport Giuseppe Taliercio, Mestre, Italy
 Palasport di San Siro, Milan, Italy
 PalaArgento (Palazzetto dello Sport Mario Argento), Naples, Italy
 Kioene Arena, Padua, Italy, formerly known as Palasport San Lazzaro
 Palasport Fondo Patti, Palermo, Italy
 PalaBigi, Reggio Emilia, Italy, formerly known as Palasport
 Palasport Roberta Serradimigni, Sassari, Italy
 Palasport Mens Sana, Siena, Italy
 Pala Alpitour (Palasport Olimpico), Turin, Italy
 PalaRuffini, Turin, Italy, formerly known as Palasport di Torino
 Palasport Primo Carnera, Udine, Italy
 Palasport Lino Oldrini, Varese, Italy

Metro
 EUR Palasport, a station on Line B of the Rome Metro